Luis Rafael Rojas Martinez (born September 14, 1990) is a Venezuelan swimmer and National Record holder from Venezuela. He swam for Venezuela at the 2011 Pan American Games. He currently swims collegiately in the United States at Florida Southern College. He comes into his senior year having earned 21 All-American awards in his career (12 individual and nine relay), with seven each season.

He also swam at the:
 2009 Bolivarian Games
 2010 South American Games
 2010 Central American Games

References

Living people
1990 births
Venezuelan male swimmers
Swimmers at the 2011 Pan American Games
Florida Southern College alumni
Sportspeople from Caracas
Pan American Games bronze medalists for Venezuela
Pan American Games medalists in swimming
Medalists at the 2011 Pan American Games
20th-century Venezuelan people
21st-century Venezuelan people
Competitors at the 2010 South American Games